Sprick is a surname. Notable people with this surname include:

 Gustav Sprick (1917–1941), German Luftwaffe fighter ace
 Matthieu Sprick (born 1981), French professional cyclist